Richard Redman (died 1505) was a medieval Premonstratensian canon and abbot of Shap Abbey, Bishop of St Asaph, Bishop of Exeter, and Bishop of Ely, as well as the commissary-general for the Abbot of Prémontré between 1459 and his death.

Redman was consecrated as Bishop of St Asaph after 13 October 1471.

Redman was translated to Exeter on 6 November 1495.

Redman was then translated to Ely on 26 May 1501. He died while Bishop of Ely on 24 August 1505.

Citations

References

 

Bishops of Exeter
Bishops of Ely
Bishops of St Asaph
Burials at Ely Cathedral
15th-century English Roman Catholic bishops
15th-century births
1505 deaths

Year of birth missing
16th-century English Roman Catholic bishops